Alejandro Gorostiaga Orrego (May 12, 1840 - October 30, 1912), was a Chilean military officer born in La Serena. He joined the Escuela Militar de Chile in 1857 until his retirement in 1878. Alejandro Gorostiaga was of Basque descent.

In 1879, colonel Gorostiaga joined the Chilean Army due to the War of the Pacific, between Chile, Peru and Bolivia. In May of that year, Alejandro Gorostiaga was named commandant of the civic battalion Coquimbo Nº1.

Participated in the Battle of Pisagua. But the most important participation of this Chilean military was the Battle of Huamachuco, on July 10 of 1883 when Andrés Cáceres' Peruvian forces were defeated.

Alejandro Gorostiaga died in 1912, Santiago.

References

External links
Biografía en 'Ejército de Chile'
Biblioteca del Congreso Nacional

1840 births
1912 deaths
People from La Serena
Chilean people of Basque descent
Chilean Army officers
Chilean military personnel of the War of the Pacific